Xinzhuang Gymnasium (formerly romanizationed as Hsinchuang) is an indoor sporting arena located in New Taipei City, Taiwan. It was built from September 1999 until April 2002 by RSEA Engineering Corporation.

Events
Xinzhuang Gymnasium has held many sporting events and concerts. It was also used during the 2009 Summer Deaflympics and the 2017 Summer Universiade. Its current tenants are professional basketball teams New Taipei CTBC DEA of T1 League, and New Taipei Kings of P. League+.

Sporting Events Hosted
 2007 and 2008 FIVB Volleyball World Grand Prix
 2009 Summer Deaflympics
 2010 BWF Super Series Masters Finals
 2017 Summer Universiade
 Chinese Taipei Open and Chinese Taipei Masters badminton tournaments
 William Jones Cup
 2018 AFC Futsal Championship

Concerts Hosted
 Shinee World III
 Shinee World IV
 2016 May 21–22 SpeXial Land
 2016 BTS Live Hwa Yang Yeon Hwa On Stage: Epilogue
 2017 SEVENTEEN 1st World Tour: Diamond Edge.
 2018 GFRIEND 1st Asia Tour: Season of GFRIEND
 2018 SEVENTEEN Concert: IDEAL CUT
 Shinee World V
 2018 MAMAMOO Concert 4 Seasons S/S
 2019 MAMAMOO Concert 4 Seasons F/W

References

Sports venues completed in 2002
Indoor arenas in Taiwan
2002 establishments in Taiwan
Badminton venues
Basketball venues in Taiwan